Serpent in the Rainbow is an Australian mini series which first screened on the ABC in 1973. It was set in the late 19th century.

Cast
 Kate Fitzpatrick
 John McCallum
 Ken Wayne
 Alfred Sandor
 Shane Porteous
 Lionel Long
 Diana Perryman

References

External links

1970s Australian television miniseries
1973 Australian television series debuts
1973 Australian television series endings
1973 television films
1973 films
Films directed by Douglas Sharp